Maldonada can refer to:-

Maldonada (Gulliver's Travels), a fictional city in Jonathan Swift's satire 
The Maldonada redbelly toad, endemic to Brazil
Auratonota maldonada, a species of moth found in Ecuador 
Laura Maldonada Clapper, a character in the novel The Widow's Children

See also
Maldonado (disambiguation)